The following low-power television stations broadcast on digital or analog channel 20 in the United States:

 K20BP-D in Phillips County, Montana
 K20BR-D in Gage, etc., Oklahoma
 K20CN-D in Fortuna/Rio Dell, California
 K20CV-D in Raton, New Mexico
 K20DD-D in Albany, etc., Oregon
 K20DE-D in Alturas/Likely, California
 K20DN-D in Wichita Falls, Texas
 K20EH-D in Hood River, Oregon
 K20FR-D in Hawthorne, Nevada
 K20FS-D in Peetz, Colorado
 K20GG-D in Duncan, Arizona
 K20GH-D in Milford, etc., Utah
 K20GJ-D in Bloomington, Utah
 K20GK-D in Pleasant Valley, Colorado
 K20GQ-D in Las Vegas, New Mexico
 K20GT-D in Indian Village, New Mexico
 K20HA-D in Caballo, New Mexico
 K20HB-D in Billings, Montana
 K20HM-D in Idalia, Colorado
 K20HT-D in Rockaway Beach, Oregon
 K20ID-D in Kingman, Arizona
 K20IJ-D in Wauneta, Nebraska
 K20IM-D in Barstow, California
 K20IR-D in Cottage Grove, Oregon
 K20IT-D in Boise City, Oklahoma
 K20IV-D in Baker City, etc., Oregon
 K20JB-D in Hollis, Oklahoma
 K20JD-D in Cherokee & Alva, Oklahoma
 K20JE-D in Navajo Mtn. Sch., Etc., Utah
 K20JF-D in Oljeto, Utah
 K20JG-D in Salida, etc., Colorado
 K20JL-D in Ellensburg, etc., Washington
 K20JQ-D in Wells, Nevada
 K20JS-D in Glasgow, Montana
 K20JV-D in Overton, Nevada
 K20JW-D in Jacks Cabin, Colorado
 K20JX-D in Sacramento, California
 K20JY-D in Olivia, Minnesota
 K20JZ-D in Green River, Utah
 K20KB-D in Huntington, Utah
 K20KC-D in Mexican Hat, etc., Utah
 K20KF-D in Davenport, Iowa
 K20KG-D in Pasco, Washington
 K20KJ-D in Bryan, Texas
 K20KL-D in Drummond, Montana
 K20KO-D in Julesburg, Colorado
 K20KQ-D in Livingston, etc., Montana
 K20KT-D in Dora, New Mexico
 K20KU-D in Montpelier, Idaho
 K20KV-D in Medford, Oregon
 K20KW-D in Saint Cloud, Minnesota
 K20LD-D in Ely, Nevada
 K20LF-D in Wendover, Utah
 K20LH-D in Ridgecrest, California
 K20LK-D in Colstrip, etc., Montana
 K20LL-D in Reedsport, Oregon
 K20LP-D in St. James, Minnesota
 K20LQ-D in Yakima, Washington
 K20LT-D in Diamond Basin, Etc., Wyoming
 K20MC-D in Pahrump, Nevada
 K20MH-D in Duncan, Oklahoma
 K20MK-D in Roseburg, Oregon
 K20ML-D in Parks, etc., Arizona
 K20MM-D in New Orleans, Louisiana
 K20MN-D in Red Lake, Minnesota
 K20MP-D in Lamar, Colorado
 K20MQ-D in Rexburg, Idaho
 K20MR-D in Garfield, etc., Utah
 K20MS-D in Richfield, etc., Utah
 K20MT-D in Mount Pleasant, Utah
 K20MU-D in Bicknell, etc., Utah
 K20MV-D in Koosharem, Utah
 K20MW-D in Rural Sevier County, Utah
 K20MX-D in Panguitch, etc., Utah
 K20MY-D in Henriville, Utah
 K20MZ-D in Mayfield, Utah
 K20NA-D in Hatch, Utah
 K20NB-D in Circleville, Utah
 K20NC-D in Logan, Utah
 K20ND-D in Summit County, Utah
 K20NF-D in Seattle, Washington
 K20NH-D in Brainerd, Minnesota
 K20NI-D in Akron, Colorado
 K20NJ-D in Elk City, Oklahoma
 K20NK-D in Cedar City, Utah
 K20NL-D in Grays River/Lebam, Washington
 K20NM-D in Leamington, Utah
 K20NN-D in Scipio, Utah
 K20NP-D in Spring Glen, Utah
 K20NQ-D in Orangeville, Utah
 K20NR-D in International Falls, Minnesota
 K20NT-D in McDermitt, Nevada
 K20NU-D in Tabiona & Myton, Utah
 K20NV-D in Fruitland, Utah
 K20NW-D in Laughlin, Nevada
 K20NX-D in Hilo, Hawaii
 K20NZ-D in Garden Valley, Idaho
 K20OC-D in El Dorado, Arkansas
 K20OD-D in Valmy, Nevada
 K20OE-D in Silt, Colorado
 K20OF-D in Malad, Idaho
 K20OH-D in Ardmore, Oklahoma
 K20OL-D in Fort Smith, Arkansas
 K20OM-D in Beaumont, Texas
 K20OO-D in Ceres, California
 K20PB-D in Williston, North Dakota
 K20PC-D in Centerville, Texas
 K38AC-D in Alexandria, Minnesota
 K40FM-D in Milton-Freewater, Oregon
 K41LL-D in Nephi, Utah
 K45KV-D in Orderville, Utah
 K48NK-D in Cortez, etc., Colorado
 KABY-LD in Sioux Falls, South Dakota
 KADF-LD in Austin, Texas
 KBOP-LD in Dallas-Ft Worth, Texas
 KBVK-LD in Spencer, Iowa
 KBZC-LD in Oklahoma City, Oklahoma
 KCWF-LP in Las Cruces, New Mexico
 KCWQ-LD in Palm Springs, California
 KDNF-LD in Arvada, Colorado, uses KRMT's full-power spectrum
 KEFN-CD in St. Louis, Missouri
 KHPM-CD in San Marcos, Texas
 KJCT-LP in Grand Junction, Colorado
 KJNM-LD in Fayetteville, Arkansas
 KLRA-CD in Little Rock, Arkansas
 KMBA-LD in Austin, Texas
 KMBD-LD in Minneapolis, Minnesota
 KMBH-LD in McAllen, Texas
 KNMQ-LD in Albuquerque, New Mexico
 KOXI-CD in Portland, Oregon
 KQRE-LD in Bend, Oregon
 KRTX-LP in San Antonio, Texas
 KSZG-LD in Aspen, Colorado
 KTFT-LD in Twin Falls, Idaho
 KTLE-LD in Odessa, Texas
 KTMJ-CD in Topeka, Kansas
 KTSH-CD in Shreveport, Louisiana
 KUVM-CD in Missouri City, Texas
 KWSM-LD in Santa Maria, California
 KXFX-CD in Brownsville, Texas
 KXTU-LD in Colorado Springs, Colorado
 KZCZ-LD in College Station, Texas
 KZSD-LP in San Diego, California
 KZTN-LD in Boise, Idaho
 KZUP-CD in Baton Rouge, Louisiana
 W20AD-D in Williamsport, Pennsylvania
 W20CP-D in Mansfield, Pennsylvania
 W20CQ-D in Hempstead, New York
 W20DF-D in Russellville, Alabama
 W20DL-D in Macon, Georgia
 W20DQ-D in Luquillo, Puerto Rico
 W20DR-D in Humacao, Puerto Rico
 W20DS-D in Caguas, Puerto Rico
 W20DT-D in Vanderbilt, Michigan
 W20DW-D in Clarksdale, Mississippi
 W20DX-D in Panama City, Florida
 W20DY-D in Roanoke, West Virginia
 W20EH-D in Pownal, etc., Vermont
 W20EI-D in Towanda, Pennsylvania
 W20EK-D in Andrews, etc., North Carolina
 W20EM-D in New Bern, North Carolina
 W20ER-D in Bangor, Maine
 W20EU-D in Chambersburg, Pennsylvania
 W20EV-D in Houghton Lake, Michigan
 W20EW-D in Augusta, Georgia
 W20EY-D in Wilmington, North Carolina
 WANN-CD in Atlanta, Georgia
 WBGH-CA in Binghamton, New York
 WBII-CD in Holly Springs, Mississippi
 WCGZ-LD in Lanett, Alabama
 WDMC-LD in Charlotte, North Carolina
 WDME-CD in Washington, D.C.
 WDNN-CD in Dalton, Georgia
 WFUN-LD in Miami, Florida, uses WLMF-LD's spectrum
 WHDS-LD in Savannah, Georgia
 WJJN-LD in Dothan, Alabama
 WKBJ-LD in Live Oak, Florida
 WKUT-LD in Bowling Green, Kentucky
 WLMF-LD in Miami, Florida
 WNGJ-LD in Ogdensburg, New York
 WNYK-LD in Teaneck, New Jersey
 WOHZ-CD in Mansfield, Ohio
 WOVA-LD in Parkersburg, West Virginia
 WQAW-LD in Lake Shore, Maryland
 WSHM-LD in Springfield, Massachusetts
 WSWY-LD in Indianapolis, Indiana
 WTCL-LD in Cleveland, Ohio
 WTSN-CD in Evansville, Indiana
 WUVI-LD in West Lafayette, Indiana, to move to channel 3
 WUWB-LD in West Branch, Michigan
 WWHC-LD in Olean, New York
 WWME-CD in Chicago, Illinois
 WZXZ-CD in Orlando, etc., Florida

The following low-power stations, which are no longer licensed, formerly broadcast on digital or analog channel 20:
 K10PB-D in Montezuma Creek/Aneth, Utah
 K20BI-D in Nesika Beach, Oregon
 K20CP-D in Elmo, Montana
 K20ES in Pendleton, etc., Oregon
 K20GP in Orangeville, Utah
 K20GU in Ruidoso, etc., New Mexico
 K20HO in Lawton, Oklahoma
 K20HX in Beowawe, Nevada
 K20HZ in Palm Springs, California
 K20IA in Prescott, Arizona
 K20KI-D in Rapid City, South Dakota
 KADX-LP in Andrews, Texas
 KAKH-LD in Lufkin, Texas
 KAQC-LP in Atlanta, Texas
 KEXT-CD in San Jose, California
 KOKT-LP in Sulphur, Oklahoma
 KSSY-LP in Arroyo Grande, California
 KTUD-CD in Las Vegas, Nevada
 KUAM-LP in Tamuning, Guam
 W20CM in Port Jervis, New York
 W20CY in Tifton, Georgia
 WAZF-CD in Front Royal, Virginia
 WCZC-LD in Augusta, Georgia
 WDUE-LD in Eau Claire, Wisconsin
 WDZA-LD in Wilmington, North Carolina
 WOTH-CD in Cincinnati, Ohio
 WPRU-LP in Aquadilla, Puerto Rico

References

20 low-power